William of the White Hands (1135–1202), also called William White Hands, was a French cardinal.

William was born in Brosse, Île-de-France, France. He was a son of Theobald the Great, Count of Blois and Count of Champagne, and Matilda of Carinthia.

William served as Bishop of Chartres in 1165, Archbishop of Sens (1169–1176), Archbishop of Reims (1175–1202), and the first Peer of France to bear that title. He anointed his nephew, Philip II of France, as co-king on 1 November 1179 in Rheims. Pope Alexander III created him Cardinal Priest of Santa Sabina in March 1179; as such, he signed the papal bulls between 8 April 1179 and 23 December 1201. He died on 7 September 1202.

William was portrayed by actor Liam O'Callaghan in the 1978 BBC TV drama series The Devil's Crown.

References

Sources

Further reading
 Ludwig Falkenstein, "Guillaume aux Blanches Mains, archevêque de Reims et légat du siège apostolique (1176–1202),” Revue d’histoire de l’Église de France, XCI, 2005, pp. 5–25. 
 Ludwig Falkenstein, "Wilhelm vom Champagne, Elekt von Chartres (1164-1168), Erzbischof von Sens (1168/69-1176), Erzbischof von Reims (1176-1202), Legat des apostolischen Stuhles, im Spiegel papstlicher Schreiben und Privilegien", Zeitschrift der Savigny-Stiftung für Rechtsgeschichte: Kanonistische Abteilung, CXX, 2003, pp. 107–284. *
 Dietrich Lohrmann, Papsturkunden in Frankreich. Neue Folge. 7. Bd. Nördliche Ile-de-France und Vermandois. Berlin: Weidmannsche Buchhandlung, 1976. (Abhandlungen der Akademie der Wissenschaften in Göttingen. Philologisch-historische Klasse; 3. Folge, Nr. 95). 
 Jules Mathorez, "Guillaume aux Blanches-Mains, évêque de Chartres", Archives du diocese de Chartres, Pièces detaches, Etudes et documents, XX, 1914, pp. 187–340.

External links
Biography

House of Blois
Bishops of Chartres
Archbishops of Reims
Archbishops of Sens
12th-century French cardinals
External cardinals
Cardinals created by Pope Alexander III
1135 births
1202 deaths
13th-century peers of France
13th-century French cardinals